Hypena vega is a species of moth in the family Erebidae.

The MONA or Hodges number for Hypena vega is 8451.

References

Further reading

 
 
 

vega
Articles created by Qbugbot
Moths described in 1900